Giovanni Battista Morandini (born 30 June 1937) is an Italian prelate of the Catholic Church who spent his career in the diplomatic service of the Holy See. He became an archbishop in 1983 and from then until his retirement in 2008 served terms as Apostolic Nuncio to Rwanda, Guatemala, Korea, Mongolia, and Syria.

Biography
Giovanni Battista Morandini was born in Bienno on 30 June 1937. He was ordained a priest on 22 July 1962 and went immediately to Rome to complete his studies. He entered the diplomatic service of the Holy See in 1966. His first posting was in Bolivia from 1966 to 1970, followed by stints in Belgium and Brazil. From 1979 to 1983 he worked in Rome at the Section for Relations with States of the Secretariat of State. While serving in that last post he was reported to have told the family of Emanuela Orlandi, a teenager who disappeared in Rome on 22 June 1983, that the Vatican wanted to minimize publicity in the case, a remark that has fueled the family’s belief of Vatican involvement in closing the investigation into her disappearance.

On 30 August 1983, Pope John Paul II named him titular archbishop of Numida and Apostolic Nuncio to Rwanda.

He received his episcopal consecration from Cardinal Agostino Casaroli on 8 October 1983.

John Paul appointed him Nuncio to Guatemala on 12 September 1990, to both Korea and Mongolia on 23 April 1997, and to Syria on 6 March 2004. 

He retired on 21 September 2008.

See also
 List of heads of the diplomatic missions of the Holy See

References

External links

Catholic Hierarchy: Archbishop Giovanni Battista Morandini 

Living people
1937 births
Apostolic Nuncios to Rwanda
Apostolic Nuncios to Guatemala
Apostolic Nuncios to South Korea
Apostolic Nuncios to Mongolia
Apostolic Nuncios to Syria